Riot Squad is a 1933 American Pre-Code crime film directed by Harry S. Webb and starring Madge Bellamy, Pat O'Malley and Addison Richards. It was produced as a second feature and distributed by the independent company Mayfair Pictures.

Synopsis
Police detectives trying to nail notorious gangster Nolan and his henchman Diamonds Jareck infiltrate the nightclub Nolan operates with the assistance of Lil Daley, who works there. Two detectives with a friendly rivalry are dropped from the detective department and transferred to the riot squad. There they continue to work at the case.

Cast
Madge Bellamy as Lil Daley
Pat O'Malley as Det. Bob Larkin
James Flavin as Det. Mack McCue
Addison Richards as Diamonds Jareck
Harrison Greene as Nolan
Ralph Lewis as Judge Nathaniel Moore
 Alene Carroll as Peggy Moore
 Bee Eddels as Ruth - Lil's Maid
 Kit Guard as 	Pug - Henchman
 Charles De La Motte as Shorty - Henchman
 John Elliott as 	Chief of Detectives

References

Bibliography
 Pitts, Michael R. Poverty Row Studios, 1929–1940: An Illustrated History of 55 Independent Film Companies, with a Filmography for Each. McFarland & Company, 2005.

External links

1933 films
1933 drama films
1930s English-language films
American black-and-white films
American drama films
Mayfair Pictures films
Films directed by Harry S. Webb
1930s American films